La Martinière may refer to:

People
 Antoine-Augustin Bruzen de La Martinière (1683–1746), French historian
  (1697–1783), first surgeon to Louis XV and Louis XVI; see École de Chirurgie
 Joseph Hugues Boissieu La Martinière (1758–1788), French botanist and biologist
 Jean Baptiste Joseph Breton de La Martinière (1777–1852), French judicial stenographer and translator of The Wanderer
 Pierre Martin de La Martinière (1634–c.1676 or c.1690), French physician and explorer

Education
 La Martiniere College, in Lucknow and Kolkata, India, and Lyons, France
 La Martiniere Calcutta, in Kolkata, India
 La Martiniere Lucknow, in Lucknow, India
 La Martiniere Lyon, in Lyon, France

Other
 La Martinière Groupe, a French publisher
 La Martinière, a French ship which transported convicts from Saint-Martin-de-Ré to the Prison of St-Laurent-du-Maroni in French Guiana
 Saint-Léger-de-la-Martinière, a French commune in the département of Les Deux-Sèvres